John Calder (5 June 1951 – 29 September 2010) was a New Zealand cricketer. He played in one first-class and two List A matches for Canterbury from 1971 to 1978.

See also
 List of Canterbury representative cricketers

References

External links
 

1951 births
2010 deaths
New Zealand cricketers
Canterbury cricketers
People from Waimate
Cricketers from Canterbury, New Zealand